Valentin Babić (born 6 July 1981) is a Croatian retired football defender, who primarily played for NK Osijek.

Club career
He also had a spell in Germany with amateur sides Hajduk Wiesbaden and Croatia Frankfurt.

References

External links
Valentin Babić profile at Nogometni Magazin 

1981 births
Living people
Footballers from Osijek
Association football defenders
Croatian footballers
NK Osijek players
Győri ETO FC players
NK Grafičar Vodovod players
Croatian Football League players
Nemzeti Bajnokság I players
Croatian expatriate footballers
Expatriate footballers in Hungary
Croatian expatriate sportspeople in Hungary